Mateus Eduardo Claus (born 3 August 1994) is a Brazilian footballer who plays as a goalkeeper for Bahia.

Club career
Born in Campo Bom, Rio Grande do Sul, Claus was a Veranópolis youth graduate. He was promoted to the main squad for the 2015 season, also serving a loan at Caxias, but did not play for either side in the campaign.

Claus joined Pelotas in 2016, being initially a backup and subsequently serving loans at Marcílio Dias and Glória. He was only a first-choice in the club's Copa FGF campaigns in 2018 and 2019, lifting the trophy in the latter.

On 20 December 2019, Claus joined Bahia on loan for the 2020 Campeonato Baiano. The following 27 May, his loan was extended until the end of the season.

Claus made his Série A on 6 September 2020, starting in a 2–2 away draw against Internacional.

Career statistics

Honours
Pelotas
Campeonato Gaúcho Série A2: 2018
Copa FGF: 2019

Bahia
Campeonato Baiano: 2020
Copa do Nordeste: 2021

References

External links
Bahia profile 

1994 births
Living people
Sportspeople from Rio Grande do Sul
Brazilian footballers
Association football goalkeepers
Campeonato Brasileiro Série A players
Veranópolis Esporte Clube Recreativo e Cultural players
Sociedade Esportiva e Recreativa Caxias do Sul players
Esporte Clube Pelotas players
Clube Náutico Marcílio Dias players
Grêmio Esportivo Glória players
Esporte Clube Bahia players